The Ghana women's national football team represents Ghana in women's association football and is administered by the Ghana Football Association (GFA); the association is affiliated to the Confederation of African Football (CAF). Football has been played in the country since 1903, organised by the national association since 8 September 1957. In 1991, the Black Queens were "hurriedly assembled" ahead of their first official match during the qualifying rounds for the 1991 FIFA Women's World Cup, a 5–1 defeat against Nigeria on 16 February 1991 — the first women's association football match on African ground.

The team's largest victories came on 29 March 1998 and 11 July 2004 when they defeated Guinea by 11–0 and 13–0, respectively. Their worst loss is 11–0 against Germany on 22 July 2016. Between 1991 and 2020, Ghana played 140 international matches, resulting in 76 victories, 28 draws and 36 defeats.

Results

Record by opponent

References

Results
Women's national association football team results